Royalton is an unincorporated community in Eagle Township, Boone County, in the U.S. state of Indiana.

History
A post office was established at Royalton (but was called Rodmans until 1838) in 1832, and remained in operation until it was discontinued in 1903.

Geography and Location
Royalton is located along Indianapolis Rd approximately 0.7 miles northwest of Marion County. The town is made up of three main streets - Royal Avenue, Circle Drive, and Harmon Avenue.

References

Unincorporated communities in Boone County, Indiana
Unincorporated communities in Indiana
Indianapolis metropolitan area